
Ostrzeszów County is a unit of territorial administration and local government (powiat) in Greater Poland Voivodeship, west-central Poland. It came into being on January 1, 1999, as a result of the Polish local government reforms passed in 1998.

As of 2006 its total population is 54,490, out of which the population of Ostrzeszów is 14,536, that of Grabów nad Prosną is 1,967, that of Mikstat is 1,840, and the rural population is 36,147.

Neighbouring counties
Ostrzeszów County is bordered by Kalisz County to the north, Sieradz County to the east, Wieruszów County to the south-east, Kępno County to the south, Oleśnica County to the west and Ostrów Wielkopolski County to the north-west.

Administrative division
The county is subdivided into seven gminas (three urban-rural and four rural). These are listed in the following table, in descending order of population.

References
Polish official population figures 2006

 
Land counties of Greater Poland Voivodeship